Mal, also spelled Mall, is a village and corresponding community development block in Lucknow district of Uttar Pradesh, India. It is part of the tehsil of Malihabad. As of 2011, the population of Mal was 6,429, in 1,199 households, while the population of Mal block was 170,962, in 31,429 households.

History 
Mal was historically the seat of a tribe of Gaharwar Rajputs, whose family tradition states that they came from Manda-Bijaipur near Varanasi under one Rai Paitawan, a brother of the ruler of Varanasi. The story goes that Rai Paitawan had gone on a pilgrimage to Nimkhar, in what is now Sitapur district, and after encountering a good omen on the way back, he decided to stay in this area. He drove out the ruling Jhojhas from their forts at Mal and Ant to become ruler himself. The Gaharwars' territory later became divided among seven estates: Mal, Atari, Salinagar, Amlauli, Masira, Hamirpur, and Nabipanah. By the turn of the 20th century, the Gaharwars' influence had declined, and they only owned about a quarter of the village lands in Mal. The remainder of the lands were held by Pandit Bakht Narain.

At the turn of the century, Mal had a population of 1,775, and it had a marketplace called Ramnarainganj after its founder, Pandit Ram Narain (Bakht Narain's father), which hosted markets twice a week, on Thursdays and Sundays. There was also a weekly cattle market. Three fairs were held here annually: the Athon fair during the month of Chait, the Mahabir fair in Jeth, and the Janamashtami fair in Bhadon. Mal's soil was described as highly fertile, and wheat was the main crop grown. Irrigation was provided by wells, tanks, and also some from the Jhingi nala, which flows to the east of the village. There were at the time two Hindu temples, one mosque, and also the mausoleum of a saint named Gulmir Shah.

Villages 
Mal block comprises the following 87 villages:

References 

Villages in Lucknow district